Naomi Wilson (born 1940) is an Australian politician.

Naomi Wilson may also refer to:
Naomi Kahoilua Wilson (born 1949), American actress best known for the role of Mahana in Johnny Lingo
Naomi Wilson, character in Brush Strokes played by Tracie Bennett